The Bert L. and Iris S. Wolstein Center is a 13,610-seat indoor arena located in downtown Cleveland, Ohio, United States, on the campus of Cleveland State University (CSU). It is home to the Cleveland State Vikings men's and women's basketball teams and the Cleveland Charge of the NBA G League.  It was also the former home of the Cleveland Crunch and Cleveland Force of the NPSL and MISL. The building opened in 1991 as a replacement for Woodling Gym and was known until 2005 as the CSU Convocation Center. It is named for Bert Wolstein, a Cleveland area real estate developer, former owner of the Force, and CSU alumnus, and his wife Iris. The main arena is known as Henry J. Goodman Arena - named for a businessman and former chairman of the CSU Board of Trustees.

It seats 13,610 for basketball, and with additional floor seating can hold 15,000 for concerts and professional wrestling. In addition to the arena, the Wolstein Center also has a practice gym and grand ballroom. It is the largest basketball arena in the Horizon League and the second-largest college basketball arena in Ohio by seating capacity.

In recent years, Cleveland State has downsized capacity for basketball to 8,500 for most Vikings games. The basketball floor is placed closer to the eastern baseline, and the western third of the arena is curtained off. For many games only lower-level seating is available and upper-level seating sections are covered with tarps, further reducing available seating. The area behind the curtain is used for a variety of other purposes, including a "Kids Fun Zone" children's play area during games, and the curtain itself is adorned with various banners facing the court.

The Wolstein Center has also hosted numerous concerts, featuring artists such as David Bowie, Elton John, Martina McBride, TLC, Carrie Underwood, Justin Bieber, Janet Jackson, 311, The Beastie Boys, The Cure, The Blue Man Group and Twenty One Pilots. The arena was site of the 1998 NCAA Division I Wrestling Championships and served as host for first and second-round games of the 2000 and 2005 NCAA Division I men's basketball tournaments as well as the 2019 NCAA Fencing Championships.

History

Construction on the Wolstein Center began in August 1989 in the aftermath of the team's run to the Sweet Sixteen in the 1986 NCAA Division I men's basketball tournament. Prior to its opening, the team played at Woodling Gym on campus or (for higher profile games) at the 10,000-seat Public Auditorium. The arena was completed on November 1, 1991 at a cost of $55 million. The 13,610 seats made the Wolstein Center the largest arena in downtown Cleveland until the opening of Gund Arena in 1994, and it was the largest university-owned arena in Ohio until 1998 when Value City Arena opened at Ohio State University.

The main arena is named the Goodman Arena after Henry J. Goodman, former chairman of the Cleveland State board of trustees, while the building is named after Bert and Iris Wolstein, who donated $6.5 million towards the building's construction, the largest philanthropic gift in CSU history. The building also contains a practice gym, a  grand ballroom, six-room conference center, and eight concession stands. In the arena, there is a 100-seat party loge located above the seating in the west baseline.

Cleveland Charge 
On June 9, 2021, the Cleveland Cavaliers' NBA G League affiliate Canton Charge  announced they would relocate from Canton to play their home games at the Wolstein Center beginning in the 2021–22 season. The team was officially renamed the Cleveland Charge in July.

Other events

Basketball
Both the 1992 Mid-Continent Conference men's basketball tournament and the 2002 Horizon League men's basketball tournament were held at the Wolstein Center, as well as being the site for first and second-round games of the NCAA Division I men's basketball tournament, in 2000 and 2005.

In the 2005 tournament, the 12th-seeded Milwaukee Panthers and 7th-seeded West Virginia Mountaineers won both of their respective games played at the Wolstein Center to advance to the Sweet Sixteen.

Cleveland hosted the 2022 NBA All-Star Game at Rocket Mortgage FieldHouse. As part of the All-Star Weekend events, the All-Star Celebrity Game was held at the Wolstein Center on February 18, 2022.

Professional wrestling
Current promotions

The Wolstein Center also hosted multiple professional wrestling events from numerous companies, including WWE's Monday Night Raw on January 26, 2009, and Friday Night SmackDown on December 28, 2010.  

Impact Wrestling's weekly Impact program taped two weeks worth of shows on August 29, 2013.

All Elite Wrestling (AEW) did a live broadcast of their flagship program AEW Dynamite at the arena on January 29, 2020 in its Cleveland debut, and returned for their Beach Break event – which encompassed Dynamite and it's companion show Rampage – on January 26, 2022.  Another Dynamite/Rampage broadcast and taping took place on August 24, 2022.

Past promotions

World Championship Wrestling (WCW) also held numerous events (including episodes of their flagship show WCW Monday Nitro) at the center until WCW's folding in 2001.

Miscellaneous
The 1998 NCAA Division I Wrestling Championships were held in the arena, won by the Iowa Hawkeyes.

The PBR's Bud Light Cup tour hosted a bull riding event at this venue in 2000 and 2001.

NBC News held a Democratic Party presidential debate between Hillary Clinton and Barack Obama on February 26, 2008 at the Wolstein Center. The debate was broadcast live on MSNBC, and was moderated by Brian Williams with Tim Russert.

The arena hosted the Kellogg's Tour of Gymnastics Champions in 2016.

The arena hosted Hot Wheels Monster Trucks Live in 2019 and 2020.

COVID-19 vaccination center
On March 5, 2021 Ohio Governor Mike DeWine announced the Wolstein Center would host Ohio's first mass COVID-19 vaccination center, which ran from March 17 - June 7, 2021.

Management
Since 2015, the Wolstein Center has been managed in partnership with Rocket Mortgage FieldHouse. The Rocket Mortgage FieldHouse staff works as a consultant to assist in promoting and booking events at both venues, while in return, select Vikings men's basketball games are played at Rocket Mortgage FieldHouse each season.

See also
Krenzler Field
List of indoor arenas in the United States
List of NCAA Division I basketball arenas

References

External links
Official site
Wolstein Center CSU Profile

1991 establishments in Ohio
Basketball venues in Ohio
Cleveland State Vikings
College basketball venues in the United States
College wrestling venues in the United States
Gymnastics venues in the United States
Indoor arenas in Ohio
Indoor soccer venues in Ohio
Music venues in Cleveland
NBA G League venues
Sports venues completed in 1991
Sports venues in Cleveland
Wrestling venues in Ohio